The 23rd Toronto International Film Festival ran from September 10 to September 19, 1998. A total of 311 films were screened during the ten-day festival, commencing with the opening gala, The Red Violin.

Awards

Programmes

Gala Opening Night
 The Red Violin by François Girard

Gala Closing Night
 Antz by Eric Darnell, Tim Johnson

Gala Presentations
 August 32nd on Earth by Denis Villeneuve
 Central Station by Walter Salles
 Dancing at Lughnasa by Pat O'Connor
 Dog Park by Bruce McCulloch
 Elizabeth by Shekhar Kapur
 Hilary and Jackie by Anand Tucker
 Judas Kiss by Sebastian Gutierrez
 The School of Flesh by Benoît Jacquot
 L.A. Without a Map by Mika Kaurismäki
 Lautrec by Roger Planchon
 Little Voice by Mark Herman
 Living Out Loud by Richard LaGravenese
 Pleasantville by Gary Ross
 A Simple Plan by Sam Raimi
 A Soldier's Sweetheart by Thomas Michael Donnelly
 Without Limits by Robert Towne

Special Presentations
 The Way We Laughed by Gianni Amelio
 Am I Beautiful? by Doris Dörrie
 Another Day in Paradise by Larry Clark
 Apt Pupil by Bryan Singer
 At Sachem Farm by John Huddles
 Down in the Delta by Maya Angelou
 Earth by Deepa Mehta
 Finding Graceland by David Winkler
 Life Is Beautiful by Roberto Benigni
 Pecker by John Waters
 Permanent Midnight by David Veloz
 Rushmore by Wes Anderson
 A Soldier's Daughter Never Cries by James Ivory
 Such a Long Journey by Sturla Gunnarsson
 Summer of the Monkeys by Michael Anderson
 The Giraffe by Dani Levy
 The Mighty by Peter Chelsom
 The Theory of Flight by Paul Greengrass
 Touch of Evil by Orson Welles
 Voleur de vie by Yves Angelo
 Wide Prairie by Oscar Grillo

Masters
 Besieged by Bernardo Bertolucci
 Aprile by Nanni Moretti
 Clouds by Fernando E. Solanas
 Conte d'automne by Éric Rohmer
 Divine by Arturo Ripstein
 Dr. Akagi by Shōhei Imamura
 Eternity and a Day by Theo Angelopoulos
 Flowers of Shanghai by Hou Hsiao-hsien
 The General by John Boorman
 Anxiety by Manoel de Oliveira
 My Name Is Joe by Ken Loach
 Cabaret Balkan by Goran Paskaljević
 The Silence by Mohsen Makhmalbaf
 Tango by Carlos Saura
 Tu Ridi by Paolo and Vittorio Taviani

Perspective Canada
 2 secondes by Manon Briand
 L'Amour L'Amour Shut the Door Por Favor by Valerie Buhagiar
 Angel Walk by Mitchell Gabourie
 Beauty Crowds Me by Julie Trimingham
 Boy Meets Girl by Jerry Ciccoritti
 Brakhage by Jim Shedden
 Bridal Path by Cynthia Roberts
 Clutch by Chris Grismer
 Cold Feet by James Allodi
 Crickets by Jane Eun-Hee Kim
 Cupid by Wrik Mead
 Les Dames du 9 by Catherine Martin
 Death Threat by Zarqa Nawaz
 Destroying Angel by Wayne Salazar, Philip Hoffman
 Dirty by Bruce Sweeney
 Echoes in the Rink: The Willie O'Ree Story by Errol Williams
 Elimination Dance by Bruce McDonald
 Elysian Fields by Leonardo Salvo
 Eve-Olve! by Sandra Law
 Extraordinary Visitor by John W. Doyle
 The Falling by Raul Sanchez Inglis
 Faultlines by Gary Popovich
 Fish Bait by Anthony Seck
 The Fisherman and His Wife by Jochen Schliessler
 The Fishing Trip by Amnon Buchbinder
 From Morning on I Waited Yesterday by Wiebke von Carolsfeld
 God Comes as a Child by Jeremiah Hayes
 Great Expectations (Not What You're Thinking) by Ann Marie Fleming
 Harlan and Fiona by Gary Yates
 The Herd by Peter Lynch
 Hustle My Crush by Heidi Gerber
 In the Future by Mike Hoolboom
 Jack and Jill by John Kalangis
 John Scott - Art & Justice by Michael McNamara
 The Last Split Second by Judith Doyle
 Last Night by Don McKellar
 Leda and the Swan by Alexandra Gill
 Le Lépidoptère by Chloë Mercier
 Let It Come Down: The Life of Paul Bowles by Jennifer Baichwal
 Mr. Aiello (La Déroute) by Paul Tana
 Michel in the Suête by Neal Livingston
 Moving Day by Chris Deacon
 Nô by Robert Lepage
 Now or Never (Aujourd'hui ou jamais) by Jean Pierre Lefebvre
 Phil Touches Flo by David Birdsell
 A Place Called Chiapas by Nettie Wild
 Rain, Drizzle and Fog by Rosemary House
 Reaction Stick by John May
 The Rogers' Cable by Jennifer Kierans
 Rupert's Land by Jonathan Tammuz
 Shoes Off! by Mark Sawers
 Shrink by Tim Hamilton
 The Sickroom by Serge Marcotte
 Sploosh by Nathan Garfinkel
 Streetheart (Le cœur au poing) by Charles Binamé
 Le Succédané by Nicolas Frichot
 Sway by Paul Carrière
 Swell by Carolynne Hew
 Under Chad Valley by Jeff Erbach
 Until I Hear From You by Daniel MacIvor
 When I Will Be Gone (L'Âge de braise) by Jacques Leduc
 When Ponds Freeze Over by Mary Lewis

Contemporary World Cinema
 À Vendre by Laetitia Masson
 All the Little Animals by Jeremy Thomas
 Bishonen by Yonfan
 Bedrooms and Hallways by Rose Troche
 The Book Of Life by Hal Hartley
 Buttoners by Petr Zelenka
 Caresses by Ventura Pons
 The Celebration by Thomas Vinterberg
 Those Who Love Me Can Take the Train by Patrice Chéreau
 Christmas in August by Hur Jin-ho
 The City by David Riker
 Claire Dolan by Lodge Kerrigan
 Clay Pigeons by David Dobkin
 Curacha - A Woman Without Rest by Chito S. Roño
 The Dance by Ágúst Guðmundsson
 Dance of Dust by Abolfazl Jalili
 Delivery of a Nation by Momir Matovic
 Desert Blue by Morgan J. Freeman
 Le Dîner de Cons by Francis Veber
 F. est un salaud by Marcel Gisler
 Fated Vocation by Nguyen Vu Chau
 Fin août, début septembre by Olivier Assayas
 Fiona by Amos Kollek
 Fire-Eater by Pirjo Honkasalo
 Full Moon Den by Karen Shakhnazarov
 Gangland by Peque Gallaga, Lore Reyes
 Happiness by Todd Solondz
 Home Fries by Dean Parisot
 The Hole by Tsai Ming-liang
 I'm Losing You by Bruce Wagner
 The Impostors by Stanley Tucci
 In That Land by Lidia Bobrova
 In the Navel of the Sea by Marilou Diaz-Abaya
 Island, Alicia by Ken Yunome
 The Inheritors by Stefan Ruzowitzky
 J'Aimerais Pas Crever Un Dimanche by Didier Le Pêcheur
 Jeanne Et Le Garçon Formidable by Olivier Ducastel, Jacques Martineau
 Jerry and Tom by Saul Rubinek
 Just One Time by Lane Janger
 The Last Contract by Kjell Sundvall
 Little Thieves, Big Thieves by Alejandro Saderman
 Little Tropikana by Daniel Díaz Torres
 Love Go Go by Chen Yu-hsun
 Love Is the Devil by John Maybury
 The Lovers of the Arctic Circle by Julio Médem
 Lucia by Don Boyd
 Luminous Motion by Bette Gordon
 The Man with Rain in His Shoes by María Ripoll
 Midnight by Walter Salles, Daniela Thomas
 Motel Erotica by Ho Ping
 My Rice Noodle Shop by Yang Xie
 Night Train by John Lynch
 No Support by Rene Castillo Rivera, Antonio Urrutia
 Notes of Love by Mimmo Calopresti
 Our Troubles Will Soon Be Over by Jorge Ramírez-Suárez
 Passion by György Fehér
 The Patriot by Paulo Thiago
 The Poet by Casey L.Y. Chan
 Rehearsal For War by Mario Martone
 The Rose Seller by Víctor Gaviria
 Run Lola Run by Tom Tykwer
 Seul Contre Tous by Gaspar Noé
 Shattered Image by Raúl Ruiz
 Snow by Eric Tretbar
 Spanish Fly by Daphna Kastner
 The Stolen Years by Fernando Colomo
 Sweet Degeneration by Lin Cheng-sheng
 This Is My Father by Paul Quinn
 Three by Carlos Siguion-Reyna
 Thursday by Skip Woods
 Titanic Town by Roger Michell
 Traffic by João Botelho
 Trance by Michael Almereyda
 Un Grand Cri D'amour by Josiane Balasko
 Under A Spell by Carlos Carrera
 Very Bad Things by Peter Berg
 La Vie Rêvée Des Anges by Erick Zonca
 Vigo by Julien Temple
 Waking Ned Devine by Kirk Jones
 Water Easy Reach by Bent Hamer
 What Farocki Taught by Jill Godmilow
 When Love Comes by Garth Maxwell
 Where the Heart Is (À la place du cœur) by Robert Guédiguian
 The Wounds by Srdjan Dragojevic

Discovery
 The Apple by Samira Makhmalbaf
 23 by Hans-Christian Schmid
 The Adopted Son by Aktan Abdikalikov
 The Adventures of Sebastian Cole by Tod Williams
 Bombay Boys by Kaizad Gustad
 Broken Vessels by Scott Ziehl
 Following by Christopher Nolan
 Georgica by Sulev Keedus
 Get Real by Simon Shore
 Getting Off by Julie A. Lynch
 Hair Shirt by Dean Paras
 Hell's Kitchen by Tony Cinciripini
 In the Winter Dark by James Bogle
 Kenoma by Eliane Caffé
 L'arrière Pays by Jacques Nolot
 Long Time Since by Jay Anania
 Mensaka by Salvador García Ruiz
 The Pianist by Mario Gas
 Porkkaalam by Cheran
 Praise by John Curran
 Radiance by Rachel Perkins
 Rosie: The Devil In My Head by Patrice Toye
 The Shoe by Laila Pakalniņa
 The Sleepwalker by Fernando Spiner
 Sombre by Philippe Grandrieux
 Sweety Barrett by Stephen Bradley
 The Terrorist by Santosh Sivan
 Trans by Julian L. Goldberger
 Une Minute De Silence by Florent Emilio Siri
 West Beirut by Ziad Doueiri
 Windhorse by Paul Wagner

Planet Africa
 Ainsi Soit Il So Be It by Joseph Gaye Ramaka
 Babymother by Julian Henriques
 Bent Familia by Nouri Bouzid
 Corps Plongés by Raoul Peck
 Dr. Endesha Ida Mae Holland by Charles Burnett
 La Vie Sur Terre by Abderrahmane Sissako
 L'Onzième Commandement by Mama Keïta
 Mixing Nia by Alison Swan
 On The Edge by Newton I. Aduaka
 Pièces D'indentités by Mwezé Ngangura
 Secrets by Sheryl Lee Ralph
 Silmande Tourbillon by S. Pierre Yameogo
 Slam by Marc Levin
 Souko Camera Box by Issiaka Konaté
 Speak Like A Child by John Akomfrah
 Take Your Bags by Camille Billops

Real to Reel
 Angel On My Shoulder by Donna Deitch
 The Cruise by Bennett Miller
 Donald Cammell: The Ultimate Performance by Kevin Macdonald, Chris Rodley
 The Filmmaker Of The Amazon by Aurélio Michiles
 Fragments*Jerusalem by Ron Havilio
 God Said, "Ha!" by Julia Sweeney
 Megacities by Michael Glawogger
 Richard Lester! by Stacy Cochran
 State of Dogs by Peter Brosens, Dorjkhandyn Turmunkh

Dialogues: Talking with Pictures
 Gone with the Wind by Victor Fleming
 Boom! by Joseph Losey
 Charulata by Satyajit Ray
 Forty Guns by Samuel Fuller
 The Four Feathers by Zoltan Korda
 The Life and Death of Colonel Blimp by Michael Powell, Emeric Pressburger
 Nazarín by Luis Buñuel
 Othello by Orson Welles

New Beat of Japan
 After Life by Hirokazu Kore-Eda
 April Story by Shunji Iwai
 Battles Without Honor and Humanity by Kinji Fukasaku
 Beautiful Sunday by Tetsuya Nakashima
 Bullet Ballet by Shinya Tsukamoto
 Cure by Kiyoshi Kurosawa
 Detective Riko by Satoshi Isaka
 Hadashi no pikunikku by Shinobu Yaguchi
 The Goofball by Junji Sakamoto
 Happy Go Lucky by Tetsuya Nakashima
 Ikinai by Hiroshi Shimizu
 Kichiku by Kazuyoshi Kumakiri
 Muscle Influenza by Keiji Ichikawa, Ken Arima
 Paradise Sea by Koji Hagiuda
 Ping Pong Bath Station by Gen Yamakawa
 Shark Skin Man and Peach Hip Girl by Katsuhito Ishii
 Sunday Drive by Hisashi Saito
 Unlucky Monkey by Sabu
 Welcome Back, Mr. McDonald by Kōki Mitani

Spotlight: Darezhan Omirbaev
 Cardiogram by Darezhan Omirbaev
 July by Darezhan Omirbaev
 Kairat by Darezhan Omirbaev
 Killer by Darezhan Omirbaev
 Life by Darezhan Omirbaev

Canadian Film Centre at 10
 Blood & Donuts by Holly Dale
 Dead Meat by Holly Dale
 The Feeler by Colleen Murphy
 House by Laurie Lynd
 The Making of Monsters by John Greyson
 Save My Lost Nigga Soul by Clement Virgo
 Shoemaker by Colleen Murphy
 Thirty Two Short Films About Glenn Gould by François Girard
 Zero Patience by John Greyson

Canadian Open Vault
 Goin' Down the Road by Donald Shebib

Midnight Madness
 The Acid House by Paul McGuigan
 The Bystander From Hell by Matthew Harrison
 Cascadeur - The Amber Chamber by Hardy Martins
 Hang the DJ by Marco La Villa, Mauro La Villa
 Heaven by Scott Reynolds
 I Woke Up Early The Day I Died by Arlis Iliopulos
 Mighty Peking Man by Ho Meng Hua
  by Peter Fratzscher
 Perdita Durango by Álex de la Iglesia
 Six-String Samurai by Lance Mungia

References

External links
 Official site
 1998 Toronto International Film Festival at IMDb

1998 film festivals
1998 in Toronto
1998
1998 in Canadian cinema
1998 festivals in North America